The European Organization for Quality (EOQ) is an autonomous, non-profit making association under Belgian law, having its legal office in Brussels.
EOQ is the European interdisciplinary organization striving for effective improvement in the sphere of quality management as the coordinating body and catalyst of its National Representative Organizations (NR's). EOQ's Network comprises National Representative, Associated, Affiliated members’ and partners’ organizations from 40 countries, reaching up to 70,000 members and 500,000 companies linked to its members.

History 

The EOQ (at that time called European Organization for Quality Control - EOQC) was established in 1956 and the founding organizations came from five western European Countries: France, Italy, Western Germany, the Netherlands and the United Kingdom. 
The EOQ spread its roots into other western European countries, before establishing links with central and eastern European countries in what was then seen as a Communist bloc. 
More recently EOQ has widened its activities to include the countries of the southern and eastern Mediterranean region.
EOQ Historical Data - Initiated Projects
 2009	Technical Working Group (TWG) - elaboration of EOQ normative documents
 2005	European Voluntary Registration System (EVROS)
 2004	Business Leaders Club
 2004	European Platform on transformation
 2003	European Quality Leader
 2002	Sustainable development
 2001	EOQ Summer Camp
 2000	European Quality Vision
 1999	European Customer Satisfaction Index
 1997	European Quality Award for SME
 1996	Anticipation and breakthrough management 
 1995	European Quality Week 
 1992	European Quality Award for Business Excellence
 1990	Certification of Quality Personnel
 1990	European Quality Award for Leadership in TQM
 1989	Yearly World Quality Day initiated by the EOQ
 1987	EOQ moves from Quality Control to Quality Management
 1985	National Quality Award
 1960	Zero default
 1950	Diffusion of statistic methods

Products and services 

EOQ's main products, services and activities:
 Organization of EOQ annual quality congresses since 1956).
 Competence certification of personnel in the field of management systems’ professions: more than 70.000 management systems professionals trained and certified based on the EOQ harmonized scheme since 1993
 Issuing and registration of the EOQ professional competence passport
 Thousands of events organized during the European Quality Week since 1995
 Granting the annual European Quality Leader Award since 2003
 Granting Georges Borel Awards since 2002
 Managing the European Voluntary Registration System (EVROS) a database on information about quality organizations and professionals since 2007
 Organizing the Business Leaders’ Club since 2004
 Organizing Summer Camps since 2001
 Actively involved in the work of European and international organizations for the development and promotion of quality, environmental protection, occupational health & safety, innovation and transformation, sustainability and corporate social responsibility (EOQ Competence Specifications and Certification Schemes)
 Developing contacts relation management in the European Community 
 Partner for the accreditation bodies associations (EA, IAF)

EOQ competence certification 

EOQ's goal is to achieve mutual recognition of qualifications within Europe hence, the registration of EOQ certified professionals. 
EOQ supports all common activities, with respect to the qualification and registration/certification of EOQ certified professionals under the EOQ Harmonized Scheme for the Registration of Personnel (in the field of quality, environment, health and safety, risk, corporate social responsibility and specific sectors), the most successful product of EOQ. 
EOQ established this scheme, called EOQ's Personnel Registration Scheme, as a part of its mission to strengthen Europe's economic system by promoting improvement in all aspects of quality - from developments in quality systems management through to the use of quality as a competitive market force, by anticipating customer needs and creating customer confidence.
For this purpose, the EOQ has formed a special unit, the EOQ Personnel Registration Unit (EOQ-PRU), who acts both as a clearing body and as a body for the recognition/certification and acceptance of EOQ certified professionals and deals with:
 Development and harmonization of EOQ Personnel Registration Schemes 
 Registration and re-registration of EOQ certified professionals 
 Assessment/recognition of PRU Agents for personnel competence certification
EOQ promotes the mutual recognition and acceptance of registrations/certificates within the framework of the scheme, actually based on mutual recognition through the European cooperation for Accreditation (EA), granted by its recognized members called EOQ-PRU Agents.
Competence certificates based on EOQ normative documents have an outstanding reputation and are objective proof of competence due to the worldwide accepted processes of assessment, examination, certification and re-certification used in accordance with the ISO/IEC 17024 standard's requirements.
Today EOQ counts more than 70,000 EOQ competence certificates holders. EOQ certificates have been commended for openness, transparency and credibility.

EOQ competence certifications

References

External links 
 

Organizations established in 1956
Quality management
Non-profit organisations based in Belgium